The Cibola National Forest (pronounced SEE-bo-lah) is a 1,633,783 acre (6,611.7 km2) United States National Forest in New Mexico, USA. The name Cibola is thought to be the original Zuni Indian name for their pueblos or tribal lands. The name was later interpreted by the Spanish to mean "buffalo." The forest is disjointed with lands spread across central and northern New Mexico, west Texas and Oklahoma. The Cibola National Forest is divided into four Ranger Districts: the Sandia, Mountainair, Mt. Taylor, and Magdalena. The Forest includes the San Mateo, Magdalena, Datil, Bear, Gallina, Manzano, Sandia, Mt. Taylor, and Zuni Mountains of west-central New Mexico. The Forest also manages four National Grasslands that stretch from northeastern New Mexico eastward into the Texas Panhandle and western Oklahoma. The Cibola National Forest and Grassland is administered by Region 3 of the United States Forest Service from offices in Albuquerque, New Mexico. Elevation ranges from 5,000 ft (1,500 m) to 11,301 ft (3,445 m). (The preceding figures do not include any of the four National Grasslands mentioned below, which are detailed in their individual articles.) The descending order of Cibola National Forest acres (not counting the three Grassland areas) by county are: Socorro, Cibola, McKinley, Catron, Torrance, Bernalillo, Sandoval County, New Mexico, Lincoln, Sierra, and Valencia counties in New Mexico. The Cibola National Forest currently has 137,701 acres designated as Wilderness. In addition to these acres, it has 246,000 acres classified as Inventoried Roadless Areas pursuant to the Roadless Area Conservation Rule. 

The Cibola National Forest is organized into several divisions over three states. The Rita Blanca National Grassland  in Dallam County, Texas and Cimarron County, Oklahoma,  Black Kettle National Grassland  in Roger Mills County, Oklahoma and Hemphill County, Texas, and  McClellan Creek National Grassland  in Gray County, Texas are in the Oklahoma-Texas panhandle region. The combined Cibola National Grasslands are 262,141 acres (1,060.8 km2) in size.

New Mexico is home to much of the Forest, including the Kiowa National Grassland  in Harding, Union, Mora, and Colfax counties, New Mexico. The Cibola National Forest's Sandia Ranger District is just east of Albuquerque in Central New Mexico and includes the most visited mountains in the state of New Mexico. The Sandia District includes national forest land in eastern Bernalillo and southeastern Sandoval counties, and includes the Sandia Peak Tram and the Sandia Crest National Scenic Byway. The Sandia Mountains lie in the northern portion of the District. It is here where Congress designated the Sandia Mountain Wilderness (37,200 acres) in 1978. The Cibola's Sandia Ranger District also includes the Manzanita Mountains, which stretch south, between the Sandia and the Manzano Mountains. The Manzano Mountains are managed by the Cibola National Forest's Mountainair Ranger District.

The Mountainair Ranger District manages national forestland in Torrance, northwestern Lincoln, and eastern Valencia counties, which are in central New Mexico. Within the Mountainair District are the Gallinas Mountains and the Manzano Mountains. Congress designated the Manzano Wilderness in 1978. The Mount Taylor Ranger District manages land in northern Cibola, southern McKinley, and western Sandoval counties in western New Mexico. Mount Taylor and Zuni Mountains are within the Mount Taylor District.

Overseeing approximately 800,000 acres, the Magdalena Ranger District is the largest of the Cibola National Forest's four mountain districts. The Cibola’s Magdalena District manages land in south central New Mexico in western Socorro, northeastern Catron, and northern Sierra counties. The Bear Mountains, Datil Mountains, Magdalena Mountains and San Mateo Mountains are all within the Magdalena District. There are two Wilderness areas in this District - the Apache Kid (44,626 acres) and the Withington (19,000 acres) Wilderness areas, both of which are in the San Mateo Mountains. In addition to the designated Wilderness, the Magdalena Ranger District has 205,972 acres of Inventoried Roadless Areas. The Magdalena Ranger District's officers are stationed in the Village of Magdalena. The District has roots in the Gila Forest Reserve, created by President William McKinley in 1899, making the U.S. Forest Service the “oldest continuous business in Magdalena.”

Ecology
Cibola biomes range from Chihuahuan desert to short grass prairie to piñon-juniper to sub-alpine spruce and fir.  The region also boasts wildlife as diverse as the biomes they inhabit.

Animals represented include:

black bear
cougar
prairie dog
mule deer
pronghorn
black rosy finch
goshawk
Mexican spotted owl
wild turkey

Due to the Rio Grande, a large variety of migrating waterfowl and other birds follow the river's flyway during the spring and fall. Birds of prey are also present using the updrafts and thermals along the north-south alignment of the central mountains for their migration.

The ‘sky islands’ region of the Cibola hosts more than 200 rare plant and animal species, with more than 30 species listed as endangered or threatened by New Mexico or the federal government. The region is home to more bird and mammal species than any other ecoregion in the Southwest. The Rio Grande Watershed, which contains the Cibola’s four mountain ranger districts, ranked second out of eight watershed regions for species of greatest conservation need (SGCN) in the New Mexico Game and Fish’s Comprehensive Wildlife Conservation Strategy. The Comprehensive Wildlife Conservation Strategy also ranked the Arizona-New Mexico Mountain Ecoregion, within which the Magdalena and Mt. Taylor Ranger Districts are located, second out of six ecoregions in the state for SGCN, with 80 identified SGCN. The Nature Conservancy has identified the San Mateo, Magdalena, and Datil Mountains within the Cibola's Magdalena Ranger District as key conservation areas due to their ecological diversity.

Recreation and special uses
The Cibola offers an abundance of recreational opportunities including picnicking, backpacking, camping, skiing, hiking, wildlife-viewing, star-gazing, horseback-riding, hunting and mountain biking as well as driving for pleasure and enjoying the aerial Sandia Peak Tramway with a restaurant and skiing at the top. The two most popular recreational activities on the Cibola are hiking/walking and viewing natural features with 35% and 15% of visitors citing these as their main activities, respectively.
 
In addition to ample recreational opportunities, the Cibola provides special facilities for scientific research. The largest special use permit on the Cibola is for the Langmuir Research Site, with 31,000-acres on South Baldy Peak. The Langmuir Laboratory for Atmospheric Research was established to study atmospheric processes that result in lightning, hail, and rain. The Magdalena Ridge Observatory (MRO), also located on South Baldy, studies astronomical events with a 2.4-m telescope and the Magdalena Ridge Observatory Interferometer. Both Langmuir and MRO are operated by the New Mexico Institute of Mining and Technology.

Additional multiple uses that occur on the Cibola National Forest include grazing, mining, logging, and oil/gas development.

History
The lands in the Cibola National Forest have a rich cultural history. The forest itself grew out of lands first established as Forest Reserves in the late 1800s to protect natural resources, such as watersheds, trees, and soils. The human and cultural history of these national forest lands stretch back well before the 1800s. Basham noted in his report documenting the archeological history of the Cibola’s Magdalena Ranger District that “[t]he heritage resources on the district are diverse and representative of nearly every prominent human evolutionary event known to anthropology. Evidence for human use of district lands date back 14,000 years to the Paleoindian period providing glimpses into the peopling of the New World and megafaunal extinction.“

Much of the now Magdalena Ranger District were a province of the Apache. Bands of Apache effectively controlled the Magdalena-Datil region from the seventeenth century until they were defeated in the Apache Wars in the late nineteenth century. Outlaw renegades Butch Cassidy and the Wild Bunch and notorious Apaches like Cochise and Geronimo have ties to the San Mateos. Vicks Peak was named after Victorio, “a Mimbreño Apache leader whose territory included much of the south and southwest New Mexico.” Famous for defying relocation orders in 1879 and leading his warriors “on a two-year reign of terror before he was killed,” Victorio is at least as highly regarded as Geronimo or Cochise among Apaches. Perhaps the most famous outlaw was the Apache Kid whose supposed grave lies within the Apache Kid Wilderness. Stories of depredations by the Apache Kid, and of his demise, became so common and dramatic that in southwestern folklore they may be exceeded only by tales of lost Spanish gold. Native Americans lingered in the San Mateos well into the 1900s. We know this by an essay written by Aldo Leopold in 1919 where he documents stumbling upon the remains of a recently abandoned Indian hunting camp.

A mining rush followed the Apache wars – gold, silver, and copper were found in the mountains. It wasn’t until this time that extensive use of the area by non-Native Americans occurred.  While some mining activity, involving gold, silver, and copper, occurred in the southern part of the range near the end of the nineteenth century, the prospecting/mining remnants are barely visible today due to collapse, topographic screening, and vegetation regrowth. While miners combed the mountains for mineral riches during the late nineteenth and early twentieth centuries, stockmen drove tens of thousands of sheep and cattle to stockyards at the village of Magdalena, then linked by rail with Socorro. In fact, the last regularly used cattle trail in the United States stretched 125 miles westward from Magdalena. The route was formally known as the Magdalena Livestock Driveway, but more popularly known to cowboys and cattlemen as the Beefsteak Trail. The trail began use in 1865 and its peak was in 1919. The trail was used continually until trailing gave way to trucking and the trail official closed in 1971.

Fires
In 2008 the Trigo Fire burned  mostly within the Mountainair Ranger District of the Cibola National Forest.

References

External links

Encyclopedia of Oklahoma History and Culture - Black Kettle National Grassland
Magdalena Ranger District - Cibola National Forest

 
National Forests of New Mexico
Protected areas established in 1931
Protected areas of Bernalillo County, New Mexico
Protected areas of Sandoval County, New Mexico
Protected areas of Socorro County, New Mexico
Protected areas of Cibola County, New Mexico
Protected areas of McKinley County, New Mexico
Protected areas of Catron County, New Mexico
Protected areas of Torrance County, New Mexico
Protected areas of Lincoln County, New Mexico
Protected areas of Sierra County, New Mexico
Protected areas of Valencia County, New Mexico
Protected areas of Dallam County, Texas
Protected areas of Cimarron County, Oklahoma
Protected areas of Roger Mills County, Oklahoma
Protected areas of Hemphill County, Texas
Protected areas of Gray County, Texas
1931 establishments in New Mexico